The oldest extant book on the genealogy of the Safavid family is Safvat as-safa and was written by Ibn Bazzaz in 1350, a disciple of Sheikh Sadr-al-Din Safavi, the son of Sheikh Safi ad-din Ardabili. According to Ibn Bazzaz, the Sheikh was a descendant of a Kurdish man named Firooz Shah Zarrin Kolah who was from Sanjar, southeast of Diyarbakir. The male lineage of the Safavid family given by the oldest manuscript of the Safvat as-Safa is: "Sheykh Safi al-Din Abul-Fatah Ishaaq the son of Al-Sheykh Amin al-din Jebrail the son of al-Saaleh Qutb al-Din Abu Bakr the son of Salaah al-Din Rashid the son of Muhammad al-Hafiz al-Kalaam Allah the son of ‘Avaad the son of Birooz al-Kurdi al-Sanjari." Later Safavid Kings themselves claimed to be Seyyeds, family descendants of the Islamic prophet Muhammad. 

The great-grandson of Sheyk Safi, Sheik Joneyd, got married with Khadijeh Khanoum sister of Uzun Hassan and daughter of Ali Beg by his wife Theodora of Trebizond, daughter of Alexios IV of Trebizond. Heydar, son of Joneyd, married Katherina who was a daughter of Uzun Hassan by his wife Theodora, daughter of a Bagrationi Georgian princess and John IV of Trebizond.

References

Sources

See also 
Safavid dynasty
Byzantine Emperors family tree
List of the mothers of the Safavid Shahs

Family trees
 Family tree
Empire of Trebizond
Dynasty genealogy